Ocean is an album by Brazilian guitarist Bola Sete, released in 1975 through Takoma Records.

Release and reception 

allmusic critic Brandon Burke praised the sombre mood of the record, asserting that "more traditional numbers like the opener, "Vira Mundo Penba," take on a sadness that goes beyond what most people understand about Brazilian "saudade," while "Macumba" is just downright dark." He gave Ocean a four out of five, saying that it has "a depth not found in the majority of his catalog."

Track listing

Personnel 
Anne Ackerman – illustrations
Doug Decker – production, mixing
John Fahey – production
David Kulka – mastering
Frans Lanting – photography
Bola Sete – guitar
Jim Stern – recording
Val Valentin – engineering

Release history

References

External links 
 

1975 albums
Albums produced by John Fahey (musician)
Bola Sete albums
Takoma Records albums